Theodorokanos was a Byzantine general of Armenian origin active under Basil II both in the East and in the Balkans.

Life 
 
His name is the hellenized form of Armenian T‘ot‘orakan ("belonging to Theodore"). A series of seals attributed to him by Ivan Jordanov allows a tentative reconstruction of his early career, holding the ranks of protospatharios and epi tou Chrysotriklinou and serving as the strategos (military governor) of Artze and as archegetes of the East. It is likely that he was strategos of Artze between 975 and 979, as the fortress was in Byzantine hands at that time, and was then promoted to archegetes, an office recently created that entailed overall command over the professional (and mostly Armenian) infantry of the eastern field armies.

He is first directly mentioned in the historical writings of John Skylitzes in the 990s (ca. 994 according to Nicholas Adontz), when he was appointed by Emperor Basil II, at the time embroiled in the long war with Bulgaria, as strategos in Philippopolis. In the year 1000, along with Nikephoros Xiphias, he led an army that rapidly captured the Bulgarian fortresses of Great Preslav, Little Preslav (Presthlavitza) and Pliska, completing the re-imposition of Byzantine control over the northeastern portions of the Bulgarian state, first conquered by Emperor John Tzimiskes in the early 970s. Shortly after, Theodorokanos retired due to his advanced age, and was replaced by Xiphias.

The generals George Theodorokanos and Basil Theodorokanos, active later in the 11th century, were considered his sons by Adontz, but, although likely, such a relationship cannot be proven.

References

Sources 
 
 
 
 

10th-century births
11th-century deaths
10th-century Byzantine people
Byzantine governors
Generals of Basil II
Byzantine people of the Byzantine–Bulgarian Wars
Byzantine people of Armenian descent
Protospatharioi